This article lists the heads of state of Hungary, from the Hungarian Declaration of Independence and the establishment of the Hungarian State in 1849 (during the Hungarian Revolution of 1848) until the present day.

The current head of state of Hungary is President of the Republic Katalin Novák, who took office on 10 May 2022. She is the first woman to hold the presidency.

For earlier rulers, see Grand Prince of the Hungarians, King of Hungary and List of Hungarian monarchs.

Hungarian State (1849)
Parties

After the collapse of the Hungarian Revolution of 1848, the restored Hungarian Kingdom became an integral part of the Austrian Empire until 1867, when dual Austro-Hungarian Monarchy was created and the Hungarian Kingdom was organized as Lands of the Crown of Saint Stephen.

Lands of the Crown of Saint Stephen (1867–1918)

Hungarian People's Republic (1918–1919)
Parties

Hungarian Soviet Republic (1919)
Parties

Hungarian People's Republic (1919)
Parties

Hungarian Republic (1919–1920)
Parties

Kingdom of Hungary (1920–1946)

Government of National Unity (1944–1945)
Parties

Soviet-backed provisional governments (1944–1946)
Parties

Hungarian Republic (1946–1949)
Parties

Hungarian People's Republic (1949–1989)

Chairman of the Presidential Council

Parties

Leader of the Hungarian Working People's Party / Hungarian Socialist Workers' Party
Parties

Hungarian Republic / Hungary (from 1989)
Parties

See also

 List of Hungarian monarchs
 List of prime ministers of Hungary

Notes

References

External links
 Rulers.org

Hungary, List of heads of state of

Heads of state